My First Miracle is a 2015 American Christian dramedy film directed by Rudy Luna and starring Jason London, Sean Patrick Flanery, Quinton Aaron and Valerie Cruz.  Kenny Lofton, Chyna Pfeva Foster served as an executive producer of the film.

Cast
Jason London as Father Lawrence
Sean Patrick Flanery as Charlie
Quinton Aaron as Brandon
Shad Gaspard as Jack
Matthew Rauch as Mark
Valerie Cruz as Heidi
Katya Martín as Angelica
Chyna Pfeva Foster as Mary

References

External links 
 
 
 

2015 films
American romantic drama films
2015 romantic drama films
Films about religion
2010s English-language films
2010s American films